The Junik Mountains, part of the Accursed Mountains, are on the border between Albania and Kosovo. Moronica Park, in southwestern Kosovo, marks the beginning of the Junik Mountains. The 1999 Battle of Košare was fought along the slopes of the Junik and Accursed Mountains.

References 

 

Mountain ranges of Kosovo
Accursed Mountains